Alexx can be variation of the name Alexander, or several other similar names. People with the given name or nickname include:

Alexx Calise (born 1985), American singer, songwriter, and musician
Alexx Ekubo (born 1986), Nigerian actor and model
Alexx O'Nell (born 1980), American actor and musician

Fictional
Alexx Woods, a character on the CBS crime drama CSI: Miami

See also
Alex
Allex (disambiguation)